Genetica is a peer-reviewed scientific journal covering research in genetics and evolutionary biology. It was established in January 1919 by Kluwer Academic (which later merged into Springer) and originally published articles in English, Dutch, French, and German. Publication was suspended from 1944 to 1946. The journal allows self-archiving and authors can pay extra for open access. The editors-in-chief are Pierre Capy (French National Centre for Scientific Research, Gif-sur-Yvette) and Ronny C. Woodruff (Bowling Green State University).

Abstracting and indexing 
The journal is abstracted and indexed in:

According to the Journal Citation Reports, the journal has a 2011 impact factor of 2.148.

References

External links 
 

Genetics journals
Monthly journals
Publications established in 1919
Springer Science+Business Media academic journals
English-language journals